First Men's Regional League, previously First Serbian League, is the men's regional basketball league in Serbia. It is the 3rd-tier of the basketball league system in Serbia. Founded in 2006, it is run by the Basketball Federation of Serbia (KSS).

Rules

Competition format
The league, operated by the Basketball Federation of Serbia and regional basketball associations, consists of four divisions, North, Central, East and West, which have 14 teams each. The first team in every division will be promoted to the Second Basketball League of Serbia. The teams positioned 13th and 14th in the First Regional League will be relegated to a lower-tier league - the Second Regional League.

Groups

History
Division champions of the First Regional League:

Current clubs 
The following is the list of clubs for the 2022–23 season.

North 
The North division is composed of 16 clubs.

Center 
The Center division is composed of 14 clubs.

East 
The East division is composed of 16 teams.

West 
The West division is composed of 16 teams.

References

External links
Official website

 
Basketball leagues in Serbia
2006 establishments in Serbia
Serb